Christina A. Gurnett is the A. Ernest and Jane G. Stein Professor of Neurology, the director of the Division of Pediatric and Developmental Neurology at Washington University in St. Louis, and the chief of Neurology at St. Louis Children's Hospital.

Early life and education 
In 1991, Gurnett completed her B.S. in biology from University of Notre Dame. In 1998, she received her MD/PhD degrees specializing in Physiology and Biophysics from the University of Iowa. She stayed at Iowa for her residency in pediatrics, before moving to St. Louis Children's Hospital for fellowships in pediatric neurology (completed in 2003) and pediatric epilepsy (2004).

Awards 

 The Marfan Foundation’s 2017 Distinguished Research Award at the Foundation’s Heartworks St. Louis

References 

Year of birth missing (living people)
Living people
American neurologists
Washington University in St. Louis faculty
Women neurologists
University of Iowa alumni
American pediatricians
21st-century American women physicians
21st-century American physicians
University of Notre Dame alumni